Boca de Yuma is a town of La Altagracia province in the eastern region of Dominican Republic. It is situated west of the mouth of the Yuma River, near the Caribbean Sea. The word Yuma is an indigenous Taíno name.

The village has a pleasant climate. It is peaceful and tranquil. A few miles west of the village is the Del Este National Park, one of the largest national parks in the country, with an area of 310 square kilometers. The bay of Boca de Yuma is used for fishing and boat trips.

History

The Beginning of Boca de Yuma
The first families that settled the village of Boca de Yuma came from various regions of the Spanish colonial Captaincy General of Santo Domingo on Hispaniola. Perhaps one of the first persons to settle here was Pedro Sifuentes, nicknamed the Portugalete. He has also been referred to as the Dominican 'Robinson Crusoe' due to the many years of living alone here after the sinking of his ship in the adjacent Yuma Bay.

Forts and pirates

Boca de Yuma had a Spanish colonial fort overlooking the Yuma Bay. The fort held a highly defensible position, with the cannons as the main defense.

The remains of a cannon is on the coastline, that is believed to be the same as the Archbishop Fernando Navarrete asked the King of Spain for, for the defense and protection of the Shrine of Our Lady of La Altagracia in Higüey. In 1877 an expedition organized by the baecista of Curaçao found cannons left underwater in Yuma Bay. They were placed as monuments on an ocean cliff where the community park and the historic lighthouse are located. Other guns and battleships remain on the Playa Blanca (White Beach).

One of the great pirates of those times, who defended the poor, was a man named Roberto Cofresi Ramirez de Arellano, born in the coastal town of Cabo Rojo, Puerto Rico. Deep below the river mouth there is a cave, where according to tradition the pirate ship "Cofresi" sank. In 1824, Roberto Cofresí engaged with a Spanish Commander in a fierce battle, after which Cofresí and his crew were captured. His death sentence took place on the morning of March 29, 1825, on the fields of Castillo San Felipe del Morro in Old San Juan, Puerto Rico.

Port

Boca de Yuma was originally known as the "Port of Higüey." Juan Ponce de León had his ship anchored in the Port of Higüey, and departed from here in 1508, for the conquest of Borinquen, Puerto Rico. In 1513 he left in search of the fountain of eternal youth, and instead made the discovery for subsequent colonization of Spanish Florida.

Boca de Yuma was an important port in the victory over the English in 1655, the Battle of Sabana Real on January 21, 1691, and the Battle of Palo Hincado on November 7, 1808. Those were great military confrontations that changed the eventual history of the Dominican Republic.

On October 29, 1808, the mouth of the Río Yuma at Boca de Yuma was the witness of the support sent by the Governor General Toribio Montes of Puerto Rico to the Port of Higüey for the Battle of Palo Hincado. The material, which has had been embarked in a Brigantine and a goélette included: two small boats equipped with guns, four hundred rifles with bayonets, and two hundred sabers. There were also two hundred volunteers, the majority emigrants from Puerto Rico.

Coast
On March 4, 1919 the landing began of American sailors to the port of Boca de Yuma from San Pedro de Macoris in the goélette Maria Consuelo, headed by Mr. Catalino Vidal. They settled where the first school was, close to the boat launch beach. Later they built the first concrete school here, named after John F. Kennedy in honor of the Thirty-Fifth President of the United States (1961–1963).

In 1966, The Incorporated Club Nautical of Santo Domingo installed an extension of the team games recreation area on the coast. It was initiated by Don Alberto Bonetti Burgos, who traveled frequently to Boca De Yuma for fishing and hunting doves.

Boca de Yuma in the 21st Century 

In 2008 the population was about 2,400 people. This hidden paradise remains a humble village surrounded by beautiful beaches. It is a town of simple individuals, and modest workers.  Boca de Yuma is within short distance of La Altagracia province, one-hour drive from Punta Cana, thirty minutes from La Romana city and an hour thirty minutes from the capital city. If you ever step a foot in Boca de Yuma you will be wrap by numerous attractions, for example hunting, fishing, hiking, biking, photography, beaches, caves and national park. The national park is home of different species of birds and animals of the region.  A navigable river of 1.5 km in length, which if you travel by boat up the river it reveals the beautiful landscapes and the caves where according to tradition the pirate Roberto Cofresí took refugee and hid his treasure.

Another place to visit is The Cave Bernard with beautiful stalagmites and stalactites, the Cave of Bernard, that name by being inside the property of John Bernard one of the first founders of the community. The dictator Rafael Trujillo to provide water to all the people built the public water fountain (La Llave Publica). From John Bernard Park off the tip of the virgin you can see a beautiful panorama of the bay, a euphoric view of the beach, White Beach, Cape San Rafael, Cape Engaño and a beautiful view of the southern part of the town.

References

Populated places in La Altagracia Province